Take a Look is a Canadian children's historical television series which aired on CBC Television from 1955 to 1956.

Premise
This series featured natural history as illustrated by artifacts from the Manitoba Museum. Host Dick Sutton of the museum was later featured in the 1957 CBC series Discoveries.

Scheduling
The first episodes of this 15-minute series was broadcast on Tuesdays at 5:00 p.m. from 5 July to 20 September 1955. It continued for a full season on Wednesdays at 4:30 p.m. from 28 September 1955 to 27 June 1956.

References

External links
 

CBC Television original programming
1950s Canadian children's television series
1955 Canadian television series debuts
1956 Canadian television series endings
Black-and-white Canadian television shows